LVM can stand for:
 Las Vegas Monorail, a rail transport system in Las Vegas
 Latent variable model, a statistical model
 Legio V Macedonica, a Roman legion
 Levenshulme railway station, Manchester, England (National Rail station code)

 Logical volume management, a method of transparently storing computer data spread over several partitions
 Logical Volume Manager, an implementation of logical volume management in the Linux kernel
 Ludwig von Mises Institute, a libertarian academic organisation
 Ministry of Transport and Communications' acronym in Finnish, Liikenne- ja viestintäministeriö.